Thomastown GAA is a Gaelic Athletic Association club located in Thomastown, County Kilkenny, Ireland. The club was founded in 1905 and fields teams in both hurling and Gaelic football.

Honours
Hurling Titles

 Kilkenny Senior Hurling Championship: (1) 1946
 Kilkenny Intermediate Hurling Championship: (1) 1983
 Kilkenny Junior Hurling Championship: (5) 1927, 1945, 1962, 2005, 2012
 All-Ireland Junior Club Hurling Championship: (1) 2013
 Leinster Junior Club Hurling Championship: (1) 2012 Runners-Up 2005
 Southern Junior Hurling Championship (7) 1924, 1927, 1945, 1959, 1962, 2004, 2005
 Southern U21B Hurling Championship (1) 2009
 Cahill Cup (Junior): (1) 2005
 Open Draw Championship: (1) 1985
 Kilkenny Minor Hurling Championship: (6) 1941, 1954, 1956, 1959, 1975, 1981
 Kilkenny Under-16 Hurling Championship: (9) 1951, 1952, 1953, 1959, 1963, 1972, 1973, 1979, 1981, 2009
 Kilkenny Under-16 Ollie Bergin Memorial Tournament: (1) 2003
 Kilkenny Under-15 Hurling Feile: (1) 2022
 Kilkenny Under-14 Hurling Championship: (16) 1946, 1947, 1949, 1951, 1952, 1953, 1954, 1956, 1957, 1959, 1970, 1971, 1973, 1982, 1991, 1993
 Kilkenny Under-14 Hurling League: (1) 2005

Football Titles

 Kilkenny Senior Football Championship: (4) 1981, 1983, 1984, 1985
 Kilkenny Intermediate Football Championship: (1) 2010
 Kilkenny Junior Football Championship: (2) 1963, 2004
 Open Draw Football: (1) 1984
 Kilkenny U-21 Football Championship: (3) 1980, 1981, 1983
 Minor Football Championship: (9) 1973, 1974, 1975, 1980, 1981, 1982, 2006, 2007, 2008
 Kilkenny U-16 Football Championship: (8) 1958, 1959, 1963, 1972, 1973, 1981, 2003, 2004
 Kilkenny U-15 Football Championship: (1) 2022
 Kilkenny U-14 Football Championship: (8) 1954, 1970, 1971, 1977, 1980, 1981, 1982, 1993, 2010
 Kilkenny U-14 Roinn B Football League: (1) 2009
 Kilkenny U-14 Football Feile: (2) 2005, 2006

Notable players
 Jonjo Farrell
 Dan Kennedy
 Paudie Lannon
 Tommy Maher
 Dick O'Hara
 Peter Prendergast
 Ollie Walsh
 Tom Walsh
 Cha Whelan
 John Donnelly

References

External links
 Thomastown GAA website

Gaelic games clubs in County Kilkenny
Hurling clubs in County Kilkenny
Gaelic football clubs in County Kilkenny